Otroeda is a genus of moths in the subfamily Lymantriinae. The genus was erected by Francis Walker in 1854.

Species 
Otroeda aino (Bryk, 1915)
Otroeda cafra (Drury, 1782) western Africa
Otroeda catenata (Jordan, 1924) Angola
Otroeda hesperia (Cramer, [1779]) western Africa
Otroeda manifesta (Swinhoe, 1903) Congo
Otroeda nerina (Drury, 1782) Sierra Leone
Otroeda papilionaris (Jordan, 1924) Congo
Otroeda permagnifica Holland, 1893 western Africa
Otroeda planax (Jordan, 1924) Gold Coast - Congo
Otroeda vesperina Walker, 1854 western Africa, Congo, Zimbabwe

References

Lymantriinae